Communist Youth League was a political youth organization in Finland. KomNL collaborated closely with the Communist Party of Finland but Communist Workers' Party activists and independent communists also participated in the league. KomNL was founded in 2000 and absolved in 2019. It is still a registered association.

KomNL was a member of World Federation of Democratic Youth.

See also
 Komsomol

References

Youth wings of communist parties
Youth wings of political parties in Finland